Bentu Liben (also known as Liben) is a town in central Oromia Region, Ethiopia.

Based on figures from the Central Statistical Agency in 2005, Bentu Liben has an estimated total population of 2,381 of whom 1,113 were males and 1,268 were females. The 1994 census reported this town had a total population of 1,273 of whom 576 were males and 697 were females. It is the largest town in Tole woreda.

Records at the Nordic Africa Institute website provide details of a primary school in Bentu Liben during the year 1968.

Notes 

Populated places in the Oromia Region